Zen Mind, Beginner's Mind is a book of teachings by Shunryu Suzuki, a compilation of talks given to his satellite Zen center in Los Altos, California. Published in 1970 by Weatherhill, the book is not academic, but contains frank and direct transcriptions of Suzuki's talks recorded by his student Marian Derby. Trudy Dixon and Richard Baker (Baker was Suzuki's successor) edited the talks by choosing those most relevant, arranging them into chapters. According to some, it has become a spiritual classic,helping readers to steer clear from the trap of intellectualism. Bodhin Kjolhede, Abbot of the Rochester Zen Center, writes that, together with Philip Kapleau's The Three Pillars of Zen (1965), it is one of the two most influential books on Zen in the west.

See also
Buddhism in the United States
San Francisco Zen Center
Shoshin
Timeline of Zen Buddhism in the United States

References

External links
Archive.org copy of the actual book, with downloadable PDF, epub, etc. available.
David Chadwick's Zen Mind, Beginner's Mind site
DC's Shunryu Suzuki archive

1970 non-fiction books
San Francisco Zen Center
Zen studies books